The Ministry of Justice of Armenia is an Armenian government agency which possesses executive authority and executes policies of the Government of Armenia in sectors that are closely associated with laws and regulations. The ministry oversees the operations of the following agencies:

 Compulsory Enforcement Service
 Penitentiary Service 
 Probation Service

The ministry was founded in 1918 by the government of Hovhannes Kajaznuni of the newly-formed Republic of Armenia.

History 
In 1920, the Revolutionary Committee of the Armenian SSR founded the People's Commissariat of Justice, which began to control the Armenian prosecutor's office in December 1923. The Communist Party of Armenia was in-active from 1930 to 1933, of which during those three years, the justice system of Armenia was administered by the Procurator General of the Soviet Union and the Supreme Court of the USSR. In 1936, the prosecutor's office and the investigative bodies were separated from the People's Court of Justice, and the People's Commissariat was reorganized into the Ministry of Justice. It operated until 1959, when its functions were exercised by the Supreme Court until the 1970s. By order of the Supreme Soviet of the USSR of November 2, 1970, the Ministry of Justice of the Armenian SSR was reestablished and became the precursor to the Ministry of Justice of Armenia which was founded in 1991, following the USSR's demise.

The Ministry also oversees the registration of political parties in Armenia. As of March 2021, there are 91 political parties that are registered with the Ministry of Justice.

List of ministers

First Republic of Armenia

People's Candidates and Ministers of Justice of the Soviet Socialists of Armenia

Justice Ministers of the Republic of Armenia

See also 

 Justice ministry
 Հայաստանի արդարադատության նախարար (Minister of Justice of Armenia)
 ՀՀ արդարադատության նախարարություն (Ministry of Justice of the Republic of Armenia)
 Politics of Armenia

References 

Justice ministries
Government of Armenia